Loughborough Lightning is an English netball team based at Loughborough University. Their senior team plays in the Netball Superleague. In 2005–06 they were founder members of the league. They also enter under-19 and under-21 teams in the National Performance League. Using the name Loughborough Students, Loughborough University also enter teams in intervarsity leagues organised by British Universities and Colleges Sport. Together with the women's cricket team and the women's rugby union team, the netball team is one of three women's sports teams based at Loughborough University that use the Loughborough Lightning name.

History
In 2005 Loughborough Lightning were named as the East Midlands franchise in the new Netball Superleague. Together with Brunel Hurricanes, Celtic Dragons, Leeds Carnegie, Galleria Mavericks, Northern Thunder, Team Bath and Team Northumbria, Lightning were founder members of the league.

Senior finals

Netball Superleague Grand Finals
Loughborough Lightning made their Netball Superleague Grand Final debut in 2007–08.

Fast5 Netball All-Stars Championship
In 2017 Loughborough Lightning won the inaugural British Fast5 Netball All-Stars Championship.

Home venue
Loughborough Lightning play their home games at the Sir David Wallace Sports Centre at Loughborough University.

Notable players

2023 squad

Internationals

 Niamh Cooper
 Michelle Drayne
 Michelle Magee
 Oonagh McCulloch

 Shamera Sterling
 Vanessa Walker

 Ella Gibbons

 Maryka Holtzhausen
 Phumza Maweni
 Renske Stoltz

 Mary Cholhok Nuba
 Peace Proscovia

 Rebecca James

 Adelaide Muskwe

Head coaches

Honours
 Netball Superleague
 Runners up: 2007–08, 2017, 2018, 2022: 4
 Winners: 2021: 1
 British Fast5 Netball All-Stars Championship
 Winners: 2017, 2019: 2

Sponsorship
In February 2023, clothing retailer Long Tall Sally were confirmed as the team's headline sponsor for the 2023 Netball Super League season.

References

External links
 Loughborough Lightning on Facebook            
       Loughborough Students Netball Club on Facebook
              Loughborough Lightning on Twitter             
                       Loughborough Students Netball Club on Twitter 

 
Netball
Netball teams in England
Netball Superleague teams